Francesco Ripa (born 5 November 1985) is an Italian footballer who plays as a forward for Campobasso 1919.

Career
Born in Battipaglia, Campania, Ripa started his career at hometown club Battipagliese. After 2 Serie D seasons, he moved to Potenza of 2004–05 Serie C2 but in the mid-season returned to amateur league (Serie Dilettanti) for Sorrento, which the team won promotion in 2006 and again in 2007, thanks to his goals.

In 2009, he left for Pro Patria, and in January 2011 moved to Nocerina, winning the promotion to Serie B. At the start of 2011–12 Serie B, he was awarded no.85 shirt.

On 31 August 2011 he left for Como in temporary deal. Nocerina relegated back to the third division in 2012. However Ripa did not play any match for the Campania side. On 9 January 2013 he was signed by L'Aquila. The club won promotion from Lega Pro 2nd Division to L.P. Prime Division, the third level of Italian football. However, on 22 August he was signed by Arzanese.

He was the top-scorer of the Group B of LP Seconda Divisione in that season, 1 goal behind Massimiliano Varricchio of Group A as joint-second top-scorer of the whole fourth division, along with Danilo Alessandro, Roberto Floriano (both Group A).

In 2014–15 season he was signed by Lega Pro Divisione Unica club Juve Stabia.

On 8 January 2020 he signed with Serie C club Picerno.

References

External links
 
 Football.it Profile 

1985 births
Sportspeople from the Province of Salerno
Living people
Italian footballers
Association football forwards
Potenza S.C. players
A.S.D. Sorrento players
Aurora Pro Patria 1919 players
A.S.G. Nocerina players
Como 1907 players
L'Aquila Calcio 1927 players
S.S. Juve Stabia players
Catania S.S.D. players
A.S.D. Sicula Leonzio players
Serie C players
Serie D players
AZ Picerno players
Footballers from Campania